Friedrich Dettelmaier (22 January 1884 – 15 November 1913) was an Austrian footballer. He played in three matches for the Austria national football team from 1903 to 1904.

References

External links
 
 

1884 births
1913 deaths
Austrian footballers
Austria international footballers
Place of birth missing
Association football defenders
Wiener AC players